Stenoma mniodora is a moth of the family Depressariidae. It is found in Colombia.

The wingspan is about 22 mm. The forewings are light moss green with the markings deep moss green and with a rather oblique fasciate blotch from the dorsum towards the base reaching half across the wing. There is a moderate spot on the middle of the costa and a linear transverse mark on the end of the cell. There is a straight transverse subterminal line. The hindwings are green whitish.

References

Moths described in 1925
Taxa named by Edward Meyrick
Stenoma